Going Through the Motions may refer to:

 Going Through the Motions, a 1982 novel by Katherine Govier
 Going Through the Motions, a 1979 album by Hot Chocolate
 GTTM: Goin Thru the Motions, 2016 album by American recording artist PnB Rock

Songs
 "Going Through the Motions" (Aimee Mann song), 2005
 "Goin' Through The Motions", a 1976 song by Andy Williams
 "Goin' Through the Motions", a song by Blue Öyster Cult from their 1977 album Spectres 
 "Goin' Through the Motions", a cover of the song by Bonnie Tyler from her 1983 album Faster Than the Speed of Night
 "Going Through the Motions", a song by Kansas	from their 1983	album	Drastic Measures
 "Goin' Through the Motions", a song by Diana Ross from her 1989 album Workin' Overtime
 "Goin' Through the Motions", a song by Robbie Nevil from his 1991 album Day 1	
 "Going Through the Motions", a song sung by Buffy in the Buffy episode Once More, with Feeling
 "Going Through the Motions", a song by McFly from their 2008 album Radio:Active
 "I Sweat (Going Through the Motions)," a song by Nona Hendryx from the soundtrack to the 1985 film Perfect
 "The Motions" (song), a 2009 song by Matthew West

See also
 Set up to fail